The 41st Guillermo Mendoza Memorial Scholarship Foundation Box Office Entertainment Awards (GMMSF-BOEA) is a part of the annual awards in the Philippines held on June 10, 2010. The award-giving body honors Filipino actors, actresses and other performers' commercial success, regardless of artistic merit, in the Philippine entertainment industry.

Winners selection
The winners are chosen from the Top 10 Philippine films of 2009, top-rating shows in Philippine television, top recording awards received by singers, and top gross receipts of concerts and performances.

Awards ceremony
On June 10, 2010, at Carlos P. Romulo Auditorium, RCBC Plaza, Ayala Avenue in Makati, Philippines, the 41st Box Office Entertainment Awards night was held.

Awards

Major awards
Box Office King & Queen – John Lloyd Cruz and Sarah Geronimo (You Changed My Life)
Male Concert Performer of the Year – Martin Nievera
Female Concert Performer of the Year – Pops Fernandez
Male Recording Artist of the Year – Gary Valenciano
Female Recording Artist of the Year – Nina

Film and Television category
Film Actors of the Year – John Lloyd Cruz and Luis Manzano (In My Life)
Film Actress of the Year – Ms. Vilma Santos (In My Life)
Film Producer of the Year – Star Cinema
Film Director of the Year – Cathy Garcia Molina (You Changed My Life)
Scriptwriters of the Year – Raymond Lee, Senedy Que, and Olivia Lamasan (In My Life)
TV Program of the Year – May Bukas Pa (ABS-CBN)
Princess of Philippine Movies & TV – Kim Chiu (Tayong Dalawa - ABS-CBN)
Prince of Philippine Movies & TV – Gerald Anderson (Tayong Dalawa - ABS-CBN)
Promising Male Box Office Star for Movies & TV – Coco Martin (ABS-CBN)
Promising Female Box Office Star for Movies & TV – Angelica Panganiban (ABS-CBN)
Love Team of the Year – Dingdong Dantes & Marian Rivera (GMA-7)
Promising Love Team of the Year – Enchong Dee & Erich Gonzales (ABS-CBN)
TV Directors of the Year – Jojo Saguin and Jerome Pobocan (May Bukas Pa - ABS-CBN)

Music category
Group Recording Artist/Performer of the Year – Bamboo
Promising Male Recording/Performer of the Year – Jericho Rosales
Promising Female Recording/Performer of the Year – Frencheska Farr
Promising Group Recording/Artist of the Year – Pop Girls
Novelty Singer of the Year – Willie Revillame
Dance Group of the Year – ASAP Supahdance

Special awards
Bert Marcelo Award – Pokwang
Comedy Box Office King – Vic Sotto
Comedy Box Office Queen – Ai-Ai delas Alas
Global Achievement by a Filipino Artist – Brillante Mendoza
Global Achievement by a Filipino Artist – Gina Pareño
Record Breaking Concert of the Year – Eraserheads (Eraserheads: The Reunion Concert)

Multiple awards

Individuals with multiple awards 
The following individual names received two or more awards:

Companies with multiple awards 
The following companies received two or more awards in the television category:

References

Box Office Entertainment Awards
2010 film awards
2010 television awards
2010 music awards